A knarr  is a type of Norse merchant ship used by the Vikings. The knarr (plural ) was constructed using the same clinker-built method as longships, karves, and faerings.

History
Knarr is the Old Norse term for a type of ship built for long sea voyages and used during the Viking expansion. The knarr was a cargo ship; the hull was wider, deeper and shorter than a longship, and could take more cargo and be operated by smaller crews. It was primarily used to transport trading goods like walrus ivory, wool, timber, wheat, furs and pelts, armour, slaves, honey, and weapons. It was also used to supply food, drink, weapons and armour to warriors and traders along their journeys across the Baltic, the Mediterranean and other seas. Knarrs routinely crossed the North Atlantic carrying livestock such as sheep and horses, and stores to Norse settlements in Iceland, Greenland and Vinland as well as trading goods to trading posts in the British Isles, Continental Europe and possibly the Middle East. They may have been used in colonising, although a similar small cargo vessel (the byrthing) is another possibility.

Only one well-preserved knarr has been found, discovered in a shallow channel in Roskilde Fjord in Denmark in 1962. Known as Skuldelev 1, it was placed among two warships, a Baltic trader, and a ferryboat. Archaeologists believe that the ships were placed there to block the channel against enemy raiders. Today all five ships, known as the Skuldelev ships, are exhibited at the Viking Ship Museum in Roskilde.

See also
 Medieval ships

References

Other sources
 Greenhill, Basil (1976) Archaeology of the Boat (London: Adam and Charles Black Publishers Ltd) 
Harrison, Mark (2006) The Vikings, Voyagers of Discovery and Plunder (Osprey Publishing) 
Crumlin-Pedersen, Ole (1997) Viking-Age Ships and Shipbuilding in Hedeby (Viking Ship Museum, Roskilde)

External links

Replica Viking ship will recreate Norse voyages in Greenland
Roskilde Viking Ship Museum

Viking ships
Merchant sailing ship types
Tall ships